Jill Spencer Grigsby (born March 8, 1954) is an American sociologist whose areas of expertise include demography and sociology of the family. She is an emerita professor of sociology at Pomona College in Claremont, California.

Early life 
Grigsby was born in West Palm Beach, Florida, and grew up in Riviera Beach and Palm Beach Gardens nearby. She moved to the Boston area with her family in 11th grade and graduated from Dover-Sherborn High School. She completed her undergraduate studies Brown University, where she majored in applied mathematics. She then earned a doctorate from Princeton University in sociology and demography. Her dissertation was titled "The Use of Contraception for Delaying and Spacing Births in Colombia, Costa Rica, and Korea".

Career 
Grigsby joined the Pomona College faculty in 1983. She was a postdoctoral fellow at the National Institute on Aging for several years in the 1980s and 1990s. During the spring 2010 semester, she taught at Doshisha University in Kyoto, Japan for the Associated Kyoto Program, and conducted research on the role of pets in Japanese family life. For a portion of the fall 2014 semester, she was the interim Vice President for Academic Affairs and Dean of the College. She retired in June 2021 as the Richard Steele Professor of Social Sciences and Professor of Sociology and was given emerita status.

Works

Personal life 
Grigsby is married to Rett Bull, a computer science professor at Pomona. She has a daughter, Janet Light, a mental health counselor. She enjoys traveling and volunteers with the City of Claremont's Committee on Aging and the House of Ruth in Pomona, California.

References

External links
Faculty page at Pomona College
Research website

1954 births
Living people
Pomona College faculty
American sociologists
American women sociologists
American demographers
Family sociologists
People from Palm Beach County, Florida
Brown University alumni
Princeton University alumni
People from Claremont, California
21st-century American women